John R. Pastor (born December 22, 1951) was a Michigan politician.

Early life
Pastor was born on February 3, 1962.

Education
Pastor earned a B.A. from Ferris State University.

Career
Pastor has worked as a building contractor, and has served on the Livonia City Council. On November 5, 2002, Toy was elected to the Michigan House of Representatives where she represented the 19th district from January 8, 2003 to December 31, 2008.

References

Living people
1962 births
People from Livonia, Michigan
Republican Party members of the Michigan House of Representatives
Ferris State University alumni
Michigan city council members
21st-century American politicians